Esmail Sohikish is a former tennis player from Iran.

Career
Sohikish competed at the 1949 Wimbledon Championships at the Men's Singles where he lost to Syd Levy at the first round.

References

Living people
Iranian male tennis players
Year of birth missing (living people)